John Alfred Turner (10 April 1863 – 23 July 1924) was an English cricketer who played first-class cricket for Cambridge University, the Marylebone Cricket Club (MCC) and other amateur sides between 1883 and 1890. He was born at Leicester and died at Roehampton in London.

Turner was the son of Luke Turner, a manufacturer of elastic webbing in Leicester whose factory is now a listed building. He was educated at Uppingham School and at Trinity College, Cambridge. At both Uppingham and Cambridge, Turner played cricket as a right-handed middle-order batsman – occasionally used as an opener – and a right-arm fast bowler, rarely used as one of the main bowlers by his teams. Without ever achieving much in the matches themselves, he was picked for the University Match against Oxford University in each of his four seasons at Cambridge. His best performances came in 1885 and 1886. Against a scratch side raised by A. J. Webbe in 1885, he scored an unbeaten 109. The following year, against another scratch side, this time raised by C. I. Thornton, he made a second innings 174 which was instrumental in enabling Cambridge to win the match after being made to follow on. The innings made Turner's reputation, and he was selected for the Gentlemen v Players match at The Oval after the university term was over, though he had no success. At the end of both the 1885 and 1886 English cricket seasons, Turner joined in a tour of North America organised by the Devonian amateur Ned Sanders, and on each of these tours there were two first-class matches; Turner's best bowling figures of four wickets for 46 runs (in 50 four-ball overs) came in a game against a "Gentlemen of Philadelphia" side on the 1885 tour. After leaving Cambridge University in 1886, Turner played only a couple of further first-class matches, though he appeared in minor matches for Leicestershire (not then a first-class team) through to 1892 and for the I Zingari amateur side to 1894.

Turner graduated from Cambridge University with a Bachelor of Laws (LlB) degree, and joined the Inner Temple. He was called to the bar and practised as a barrister on the Midland Circuit. His address at the time of his death in 1924 was in Knightsbridge, London, though he died in The Priory, Roehampton.

References

External links

1863 births
1924 deaths
English cricketers
Cambridge University cricketers
Marylebone Cricket Club cricketers
Gentlemen cricketers
People educated at Uppingham School
Alumni of Trinity College, Cambridge
Gentlemen of England cricketers
E. J. Sanders' XI cricketers